A harrier is any of the several species of diurnal hawks sometimes placed in the subfamily Circinae of the bird of prey family Accipitridae.  Harriers characteristically hunt by flying low over open ground, feeding on small mammals, reptiles, or birds.  The young of the species are sometimes referred to as ring-tail harriers. They are distinctive with long wings, a long narrow tail, the slow and low flight over grasslands and skull peculiarities. The harriers are thought to have diversified with the expansion of grasslands and the emergence of  grasses about 6 to 8 million years ago during the Late Miocene and Pliocene.

Taxonomy

The genus Circus was introduced by the French naturalist Bernard Germain de Lacépède in 1799. The type species was subsequently designated as the western marsh harrier.  Most harriers are placed in this genus. The word Circus is derived from the Ancient Greek kirkos, referring to a bird of prey named for its circling flight (kirkos, "circle"), probably the hen harrier. The name harrier is thought to have been derived either from Harrier (dog), or by a corruption of harrower, or directly from harry.

Ring-tails
Ring-tail is an informal term used by birders for the juveniles and females of several harrier species when seen in the field and not identifiable to an exact species.  Ring-tail harriers include the juveniles and females of Montagu's harrier (Circus pygargus), hen harrier (Circus cyaneus), and pallid harrier (Circus macrourus).

Species
The genus contains 16 species:
 Montagu's harrier, Circus pygargus – Eurasia, winters in Africa and India
 Hen harrier, Circus cyaneus – Eurasia 
 Northern harrier, Circus hudsonius – North America
 Western marsh harrier, Circus aeruginosus – Europe, western Asia; winter range includes Africa and India. 
 Eastern marsh harrier, Circus spilonotus – Asia (migratory)
 African marsh harrier, Circus ranivorus – southern and central Africa
 Swamp harrier, Circus approximans – New Zealand, Australia, Pacific islands
 Papuan harrier, Circus spilothorax – New Guinea (formerly treated as a subspecies of C. spilonotus, then C. approximans, but now considered distinct)
 Malagasy harrier, Circus macrosceles (formerly in C. maillardi) – Indian Ocean (Madagascar and the Comoro Islands)
 Réunion harrier, Circus maillardi – (Indian Ocean) Réunion Island
 Long-winged harrier, Circus buffoni – South America
 Spotted harrier, Circus assimilis – Australia, Indonesia
 Black harrier, Circus maurus – southern Africa
 Cinereous harrier, Circus cinereus – South America
 Pallid harrier, Circus macrourus – migratory: eastern Europe, Asia, Africa (winter)
 Pied harrier, Circus melanoleucos – Asia

Fossils
  Eyles's harrier, Circus eylesi (prehistoric)
  Wood harrier, Circus dossenus (prehistoric)

The subfamily Circinae has traditionally included the genera Polyboroides and Geranospiza which include three species - the Madagascar harrier-hawk, (Polyboroides radiatus), the African harrier-hawk, (Polyboroides typus) and the crane hawk, (Geranospiza caerulescens). This may however not be a valid subfamily as the monophyletic genus Circus is nested within the Accipiter groups while the other two genera are paraphyletic and are part of the larger Buteonine clade. Many species in the genus Circus show very low diversity in their mitochondrial DNA due perhaps due to extreme drops in their populations. They are prone to fluctuations with varying prey densities.

References

External links

 Harrier videos on the Internet Bird Collection
 Harrier videos on the Internet Bird Collection